Maple Grove Farm was a historic home located at Middletown, New Castle County, Delaware, USA. It was built about 1840, and was a -story, five-by-two bay, frame Georgian house with a two-story, frame gabled wing to the east and a two-story kitchen wing to the rear. It featured a full width front porch supported by Doric order columns. Also on the property was a small stone, stuccoed structure which appears to have been a meathouse.

It was listed on the National Register of Historic Places in 1985 and demolished between 1992 and 2002.

References

Houses on the National Register of Historic Places in Delaware
Georgian architecture in Delaware
Houses completed in 1840
Houses in New Castle County, Delaware
National Register of Historic Places in New Castle County, Delaware